Margaret Howard (née Audley), Duchess of Norfolk (1540 – 9 January 1564) was the sole surviving child of Thomas Audley, 1st Baron Audley of Walden, and Lady Elizabeth Grey, herself the daughter of Thomas Grey, 2nd Marquess of Dorset, and his wife Margaret Wotton, therefore Margaret was a first cousin of Henry Grey, 1st Duke of Suffolk, father of Lady Jane Grey.

Marriages
Margaret was a wealthy heiress and married first, without issue, Lord Henry Dudley, the youngest son of John Dudley, 1st Duke of Northumberland. Her lands were confiscated when her father-in-law was found guilty of treason and executed. In 1556, after her husband had been pardoned, they sued in chancery court to gain back her territory in Hertfordshire, which had been claimed by Thomas Castell. Henry Dudley was killed at the storming of St. Quentin on 27 August 1557.

In early 1558, Margaret was betrothed to Thomas Howard, 4th Duke of Norfolk. In order for the marriage to take place under Catholic canon law, a dispensation had to be requested from Pope Paul IV, since Norfolk's first wife, Lady Mary FitzAlan, had been Margaret's first cousin. Her future husband sent lawyers to Rome to negotiate obtaining the dispensation, but the Holy See was notorious for its delays and its costs where dispensations were concerned. Due to these delays, added to the fact that also in November of that same year, Catholic Queen Mary I had died and was succeeded by Elizabeth I who began to restore Protestantism, the marriage was celebrated without the dispensation. It was ratified by Parliament in March 1559.  

In January 1559, the new Duchess of Norfolk participated in the coronation of Elizabeth I. Lady Margaret Douglas, the queen's cousin, and the Duchess were the two principal ladies of honour who rode behind the queen in her procession from the Tower of Westminster. The following day, she accompanied her husband who carried St Edward's Crown to Westminster Abbey, while she bore the train of the new queen. After the coronation, the Norfolks retired to Kenninghall and did not return to London until the following autumn.

The Duke and Duchess had four children:

 Lady Elizabeth Howard (1560-d. yng), who died young.
 Thomas Howard, 1st Earl of Suffolk (1561-1626), who firstly married his step-sister, Mary Dacre, no issue. He married secondly to Katherine Knyvet c. 1583 and had issue.
 Lady Margaret Howard (1562-1591), who married Robert Sackville, 2nd Earl of Dorset and had issue.
 Lord William Howard of Naworth Castle and Henderskelfe Castle (now the site of Castle Howard) (1563-1640), who married Elizabeth Dacre, daughter of Thomas Dacre, 4th Baron Dacre and Elizabeth Leyburne, who coincidentally became Duchess of Norfolk in 1567 as the third wife of the 4th Duke of Norfolk. Had issue.

Death
Margaret Howard rejoined her husband for Christmas in 1563 when she was still weak from the birth of her fourth child three weeks earlier. She became ill on the journey and died at Norwich on 9 January 1564. She was buried at St. John the Baptist's church at Norwich alongside Norfolk's first wife and her cousin, Lady Mary FitzAlan. A large tomb on which heraldic quarterings and the two effigies are shown in their robes of state was erected in their honour. After Margaret's death, her mother Lady Elizabeth Grey watched over her grandchildren until the Duke remarried to Elizabeth Leyburne in 1567.

Ancestry

Notes

References
Adams, Simon: Leicester and the Court: Essays in Elizabethan Politics. Manchester UP. 2002; 
Beer, B.L.: Northumberland: The Political Career of John Dudley, Earl of Warwick and Duke of Northumberland. The Kent State University Press. 1973; 
Neville Williams: Thomas Howard, Fourth Duke of Norfolk. Barrie & Rockliff. 1964.

1540 births
1564 deaths
Margaret
Daughters of barons
16th-century English women
16th-century English nobility
Margaret
Wives of knights